The 1905 Nebraska Cornhuskers football team represented the University of Nebraska as an independent during the 1905 college football season. Led by Walter C. Booth in his sixth and final season as head coach, the Cornhuskers compiled a record of 8–2, excluding one exhibition game. Nebraska played home games at Antelope Field in Lincoln, Nebraska.

Booth retired from coaching following the 1905 season, departing Nebraska with a 46–8–1 record. His 46 wins were a school record until 1966, when he was passed by Bob Devaney.

Schedule

Coaching staff

Roster

Game summaries

Grand Island

Booth missed Nebraska's season-opening win with an illness. This was the final meeting between Grand Island and Nebraska.

Lincoln High

This was the eighth and final exhibition game between Lincoln High and Nebraska.

South Dakota

South Dakota's only points came after returning a fumble for a touchdown. Nebraska dominated the remainder of the game to win 42–6.

Knox

Nebraska defeated Knox 16–0 in what was described as "another early season walk through warm up game."

at Michigan

Nebraska met Michigan for the first time in 1905, the final season Michigan played at Regents Field. The Wolverines were led by Fielding H. Yost, marking the first time NU had played one of its past head coaches. Michigan pulled away after a scoreless first half to win 31–0.

at Creighton

A week after a humbling loss at Michigan, Nebraska set new program records for points scored and margin of victory in a 102–0 win over Creighton in Omaha. NU scored more points in the second half than in the first despite an enormous lead.

Iowa State

After a three-year hiatus, Nebraska renewed its series with Iowa State. NU shut out the Cyclones 21–0 in heavy rain.

Colorado

Nebraska shut out Coloraso in front of 4,012 fans, a school record for a non-Thanksgiving Day crowd.

at Minnesota

Doane

Nebraska claimed a sixth state championship with a 43–5 victory over Doane.

Illinois

References

Nebraska
Nebraska Cornhuskers football seasons
Nebraska Cornhuskers football